Fútbol Club Cartagena, S.A.D. is a Spanish football team based in Cartagena, in the Region of Murcia, Spain. Founded in 1995 it currently plays in Segunda División, holding home games at Estadio Cartagonova, with a capacity of 15,105 spectators.

The club is considered to be a continuation of Cartagena CF, founded in 1919.

History
Cartagena was founded on 25 July 1995, in the place of Club Deportivo Balsicas, due to serious economic problems of the first team of the city, Cartagena FC, the first president Florentino Manzano was the founder. In the first eight years it was known as Cartagonova Fútbol Club, and first played in the third division in the 1998–99 season.

The club then changed its name to Fútbol Club Cartagena and Luis Oliver took over as president, starting his tenure with the club immerse in economic problems and close to relegation. Being saved from folding by local entrepreneur Francisco Gómez after the 2002–03 campaign, it consolidated itself in the third level and achieved another promotion, now to division two, in 2009.

Historic side Cartagena FC, which was founded much earlier, acted as reserve team between 2003 and 2009, eventually re-gaining its independence. In 2009–10's second division season Efesé nearly achieved another promotion, finishing eventually in fifth position; all promotion hopes were dashed in the 41st and penultimate matchday, with a 0–1 away loss against Recreativo de Huelva.

Cartagena was relegated from the second tier at the end of 2011–12. In May 2015, a late goal from Carlos Martínez saved the club from a further drop by winning a play-off on the away goals rule against Las Palmas Atlético. Three years later, the team fell at the final promotion hurdle to Extremadura UD by a single goal.

On 19 July 2020, Cartagena was promoted to Segunda Division after an 8-year absence.

Season to season

6 seasons in Segunda División
19 seasons in Segunda División B
2 seasons in Tercera División

Players

Current squad

Reserve team

Out on loan

Current technical staff

Reserve team
FC Cartagena B is FC Cartagena's reserve team since 2015. It was founded in that year and plays in Tercera División.

In the past, other sides such as Cartagena Promesas, FC Cartagena-La Unión, Cartagena FC and CD Algar were the club's B-team.

Stadium
Cartagena holds home matches at Estadio Cartagonova. Inaugurated on 7 February 1988, it has a capacity of 14,532 spectators, measuring 105 x 68 meters; it underwent renovation in January 2000.

The ground's biggest attendance was recorded 30 June 1999 in a second division promotion playoff match against Córdoba CF, with 20,000 spectators in the stands. On 26 January of the following year, the first Spain national team game ever hosted in the Region of Murcia took place, a friendly with Poland.

Kit evolution

Famous players
Note: this list includes players that have played at least 100 league games and/or have reached international status.

Famous coaches
 Víctor Manuel Fernández
 Juan Ignacio Martínez
 Francisco Jémez
 José Murcia

References

External links

Official website 
Futbolme team profile 
Peña Goto Cartago, fansite 

 
Football clubs in the Region of Murcia
Association football clubs established in 1995
1995 establishments in Spain
Sport in Cartagena, Spain
Segunda División clubs